Ali Hassimshah Omarshah (born 7 August 1959), known as Ali Shah , is a former Zimbabwean international cricketer. An all-rounder who batted left-handed and bowled right-arm medium pace, Shah played in three Test matches and 28 One Day Internationals (ODIs) for Zimbabwe between 1983 and 1996, and was the first non-white player to represent the country. He was educated at Morgan High School.

International career
Shah played in three Cricket World Cups, in 1983, 1987 and 1992, and was also a member of the team that won the ICC Trophy in 1986 and 1990. Towards the end of his career, he played domestically for Mashonaland in the Logan Cup.

After cricket
After retiring from playing, Shah became a television commentator and a selector of the national team. He was removed from the latter role in 2004 following the sacking of captain Heath Streak.

References

1959 births
Living people
Cricketers from Harare
Zimbabwean people of Indian descent
Mashonaland cricketers
Zimbabwe Test cricketers
Zimbabwe One Day International cricketers
Zimbabwean cricketers
Cricketers at the 1983 Cricket World Cup
Cricketers at the 1987 Cricket World Cup
Cricketers at the 1992 Cricket World Cup